Tamarack Ski Area is a former ski area in the western United States, located in north central Idaho,  northwest of Troy in Latah County.

History

The ski area opened in January 1966, just below the summit of East Moscow Mountain on Tamarack Road, its slopes faced east and southeast. The area had various owners and, due to varying snowfall, was open intermittently for several decades. The land on which the ski area operated was owned by the city of Troy. Known as "Moscow Mountain Ski Area" during its first few months, it was renamed Tamarack in the fall of 1966.

Tamarack's target market was Moscow and Pullman, Washington, and primarily its respective students at the University of Idaho and Washington State University. 

Termination
Owed back taxes, Latah County seized the leasehold improvements (equipment & buildings) and put up for auction in February 1992, but there were no takers for the minimum bid of $21,000.  The city of Troy sued the leaseholders and entered in an agreement with the county to pay the back taxes after the sale of the T-bar lift in April, which started at a minimum bid of $1,900.  

The lift was purchased by Cottonwood Butte ski area near Cottonwood; Tamarack's A-frame day lodge was later demolished and its foundation removed.

See also
North–South Ski Bowl – near Emida (defunct)
Bald Mountain Ski Area – near Pierce (active)

References

External links
Latah County Historical Society - Tamarack ski lodge
Summit Post.org - East Moscow Mountain
Yo Idaho - ¡Viva la Palouse! - East Moscow Mountain

1966 establishments in Idaho
Ski areas and resorts in Idaho
Tourist attractions in Latah County, Idaho